OMAPZoom-II is a Mobile Development Platform (MDP) built around Texas Instruments' (TI) OMAP 3430 processor. 

It has a full QWERTY keypad, a 4.1" WVGA capacitive multi touch screen, Wireless 802.11, 3G, FM and Bluetooth connectivity options.  Also, expansion  
slots are available for MMC/SD and SIM cards.  An external debug board is available with 3 JTAG headers to enable full debugging with various debug tools in the market.
Currently distributions such as Android, Angstrom, and Poky are supported on this platform.

See also
 Beagle Board
 Texas Instruments DaVinci 
 Pandora (console)
 Omnia HD
 Sony Ericsson Idou
 Palm Pre
 Raspberry Pi

External links

Texas Instruments hardware
Embedded Linux